Fan Expo is a group of fan conventions operated by Fan Expo HQ, a unit of the Informa Connect division of Informa plc. Most of its events are run under the Fan Expo brand, which stems from its namesake, the Toronto-based Fan Expo Canada.

History 
In 2013, Informa announced its acquisition of Hobby Star Marketing, organizer of Fan Expo Canada—a Canadian comic and entertainment convention held annually at the Metro Toronto Convention Centre. In 2014, Informa acquired the Dallas Comic Con. In 2015, Informa acquired MegaCon in Orlando.

In August 2016, Informa acquired Boston Comic Con, which was rebranded as Fan Expo Boston in 2018. In October 2017, Informa acquired the Calgary Comic and Entertainment Expo and Edmonton Comic and Entertainment Expo. In March 2021, Informa acquired Denver Pop Culture Con, which was rebranded as Fan Expo Denver.

In August 2021, Informa acquired Wizard Entertainment's conventions; all of its remaining events for 2021 were cancelled, barring Wizard World Chicago (which was held in October 2021 as the final Wizard World-branded event). All six of its conventions in Chicago, Cleveland, New Orleans, St. Louis, Philadelphia, and Portland were rebranded as Fan Expo beginning in 2022.
Fan expo was held in Vancouver in February 2023 and attracted many anime fans. Voice actors and others from anime productions were in attendance, and there were long lines of people waiting to get autographs. The event was very crowded with visitors.

Events 
Events held as part of the Fan Expo family include:
Calgary Comic and Entertainment Expo
Edmonton Comic and Entertainment Expo
Fan Expo Boston
Fan Expo Canada (Toronto)
Toronto Comicon
Fan Expo Chicago
Fan Expo Cleveland
Fan Expo Dallas
Dallas Fan Festival
Fan Expo Denver
Fan Expo New Orleans
Fan Expo San Francisco
Fan Expo St. Louis
Fan Expo Philadelphia
Fan Expo Portland
Fan Expo Vancouver
MegaCon

Former events 

 Fan Expo Regina
 MegaCon Tampa Bay

See also 
 ReedPOP

References 

Comics conventions in the United States
Comics conventions in Canada
Informa brands